Lieutenant Colonel Arthur Godfrey Peuchen (April 18, 1859 – December 7, 1929) was a Canadian businessman and RMS Titanic survivor.

Early life
Born in Montreal, Quebec, Peuchen was the son of a railroad contractor; his maternal grandfather managed the London, Brighton and South Coast Railway. He was educated in private schools.

“Born in Montreal in 1859, Peuchen what is the son of German immigrant parents. His father has been a railroad contractor in South America and his grandfather had managed the London, Brighton and Midland Railway. In 1871 he moved to Toronto....” from Titanic, the Canadian Story by Alan Hustak (1998). 

In 1888, he entered military life and became a lieutenant of The Queen's Own Rifles of Canada. Peuchen moved up the ranks, and in 1911, was marshalling officer at the coronation of King George V and Queen Mary.

In 1897, Peuchen perfected plans for extracting useful chemicals from coarse hardwoods and waste woods, the principal products being acetic acid, acetate of lime, acetone, methanol, and formaldehyde. The acids were used by dyeing industries, formaldehyde was used by wheat growers in Canada, and acetone was used to manufacture high explosives like cordite.

Peuchen subsequently became president of Standard Chemical, Iron & Lumber Company of Canada, Ltd. The company had many plants and facilities in Canada, as well as refineries located in Canada (Montreal), France, (Germany), and the UK (London). Because some company facilities were located abroad, Peuchen often traveled to Europe by ship.

Peuchen owned a yacht named Vreda which crossed the Atlantic under its own canvas. For a time, he was Vice-Commodore and Rear-Commodore of the Royal Canadian Yacht Club. He also owned a vast, Victorian estate and mansion called "Woodlands," located on Kempenfelt Bay, near Barrie, Ontario just north of Toronto.

Titanic
Peuchen boarded Titanic at Southampton, on April 10, 1912, as a first-class passenger on his 40th transatlantic voyage. He reportedly was concerned that Captain Smith was in command, because he thought Smith was a poor commander and too old.

On the night Titanic sank, Peuchen was near Lifeboat No. 6 as it was being lowered, until Quartermaster Robert Hichens shouted above that the boat was poorly manned. Second Officer Lightoller asked if there were any other seamen available, and when Peuchen saw none were present, he stepped forward to volunteer, telling Lightoller that he was a yachtsman. Captain Smith was standing nearby and suggested Peuchen go down to the Promenade Deck, so he could break a window and climb into Lifeboat No. 6. Lightoller replied, however, that Peuchen could slide down the ropes to enter the boat if he was as good a sailor as he claimed. Peuchen then took a rope, swung off the ship, and climbed hand-under-hand down to Lifeboat No. 6. He was the only male passenger that Lightoller would allow into a lifeboat that night. He later claimed he did not realize Titanic was doomed until he viewed the ship from the lifeboat. After he was in the boat, Peuchen realized that during his climb down into lifeboat, his wallet had fallen out of his pocket and into the water.

Because Peuchen was a military officer, he came under scrutiny for allowing Hichens to prevent the boat's occupants from going back for survivors and for tolerating the verbal abuse Hichens reportedly gave. Peuchen was also criticized for exaggerating his own role and for not recognizing the pivotal role Margaret (Mrs J J) Brown played in leading the lifeboat's occupants in rowing and in raising morale. It is possible that Peuchen, as a yachtsman, may have thought that second-guessing an officer in charge would encourage mutiny.

Peuchen publicly blasted Captain Smith and the crew of Titanic, criticizing their seamanship as substandard; however, his official testimony at the United States Senate inquiry into the disaster was tempered somewhat from interviews he gave in the days after the rescue.

In 1987, Peuchen's wallet was recovered from the area around the remains of Titanic; streetcar tickets, a traveler's cheque, and his calling card were found inside.

Later years
In Toronto, some deemed Peuchen a coward given that he was a man who had survived the sinking, but most found his participation in the ill-fated voyage to be largely heroic and courageous. In part due to this debated reputation, speculation gathered that his expected promotion to lieutenant-colonel in The Queen's Own Rifles would not be awarded. Despite the conjecture, the promotion was made on May 21, 1912; he also received the Volunteer Officers' Decoration. When World War I began, Peuchen retired from Standard Chemical to command the Home Battalion of the Queen's Own Rifles.

He died in Toronto on December 7, 1929 in his 71st year. His body was buried in Toronto's Mount Pleasant Cemetery. While some reports suggested he died penniless after bad investments, his descendants (who benefited from his wealth) have debunked that myth.

Portrayals
Robert Ayres in A Night to Remember

References

External links

Middletown, Jesse Edgar. The Municipality of Toronto – A History. Dominion Publishing, 1923.
 
Encyclopedia Titanica biography
 

1859 births
1929 deaths
Canadian Militia officers
RMS Titanic survivors
Queen's Own Rifles of Canada officers
Military personnel from Montreal
Canadian military personnel of World War I
Burials at Mount Pleasant Cemetery, Toronto